(born May 14, 1984) is a Japanese footballer and a coach. A long-time veteran of Major League Soccer, he has also played in Poland. He was the first player in MLS history who was born in Japan.

Career

College and amateur
Kimura's career in organized soccer began with the youth team of Kawasaki Frontale. By the age of 15, he played for the Kawasaki Frontale reserve team. A foot injury at age of 17 hampered his opportunity to sign a professional contract with the club. Despite this, he would eventually earn an athletic scholarship to play college soccer at Western Illinois University after moving to the United States, where he took an intensive English-language course and the SAT, on which he achieved a near-perfect score on its mathematics section. A four-year letterman with the Leathernecks from 2003 to 2006, he also played with the Thunder Bay Chill of the USL Premier Development League.

Professional
Kimura was drafted by Colorado Rapids in the 2007 MLS Supplemental Draft, and in doing so became first Japanese-born player in the history of Major League Soccer. He was a bit-part player for much of his first two seasons, playing four games in his rookie season, and featuring in 18 games in 2008, 17 as a starter. He scored his first career goal on May 2, 2009, in a game against Real Salt Lake. During the 2010 playoffs, he scored the game-winning goal against San Jose that sent the Colorado Rapids to MLS Cup 2010. Kimura then played for a full 90 minutes (plus 30 minutes of extra time) to help the Colorado Rapids capture the MLS Cup against FC Dallas with a 2–1 victory in Toronto, Ontario. While with Colorado Kimura appeared in 117 league matches and scored 4 goals.

Kimura was traded to Portland Timbers in exchange for allocation money and an international roster slot in July 2012.  Five months later, Kimura was traded to New York Red Bulls along with a second-round pick in the 2013 MLS SuperDraft in exchange for Home Grown Player rights to Bryan Gallego and allocation money. On March 3, 2013, Kimura made his official debut for New York starting for his new club in a 3–3 draw against his former club Portland Timbers.

Following the 2014 season, New York announced that it would not exercise its 2015 contract option on Kimura.

In February 2015, Kimura signed with Polish side Widzew Łódź.

In July 2015, Kimura signed with Atlanta Silverbacks of the North American Soccer League.

In January 2016, he signed with expansion Rayo OKC.

On December 7, 2017, Nashville SC announced Kimura as a new signing.

Personal
Kimura holds a U.S. green card which qualifies him as a domestic player for MLS roster purposes.

Honours

Colorado Rapids
Major League Soccer Eastern Conference Championship (1): 2010
Major League Soccer MLS Cup (1): 2010

New York Red Bulls
MLS Supporters' Shield (1): 2013

References

External links
 
 

1984 births
Living people
Association football midfielders
Atlanta Silverbacks players
Colorado Rapids draft picks
Colorado Rapids players
Expatriate footballers in Poland
Expatriate soccer players in the United States
Japanese footballers
Japanese expatriate footballers
Japanese expatriate sportspeople in the United States
Major League Soccer players
New York Red Bulls players
North American Soccer League players
Portland Timbers players
USL League Two players
Rayo OKC players
Sportspeople from Kobe
Thunder Bay Chill players
FC Tulsa players
USL Championship players
Western Illinois Leathernecks men's soccer players
Widzew Łódź players
Nashville SC (2018–19) players